Martin Cibák (born 17 May 1980) is a Slovak former professional ice hockey player.

Biography
Cibák was born in Liptovský Mikuláš, Czechoslovakia. As a youth, he played in the 1994 Quebec International Pee-Wee Hockey Tournament with a team from Poprad.

Cibák won the Stanley Cup with Tampa Bay Lightning in the 2003–04 NHL season, and also played with the Slovak National Team in the 2004 World Cup of Hockey. Cibak earned the nickname "Cibby" while playing for the Tampa Bay Lightning.

He signed a one-year contract with Frölunda HC in August, 2006. In summer 2007, he signed a contract with Södertälje SK and left the club on 26 April 2009 to sign with HC Spartak Moscow on 6 May 2009.

Slalom canoeist Peter Cibák is his cousin.

Career statistics

Regular season and playoffs

International

References

External links
 
 Martin Cibák at the Tampa Bay Lightning page
 

1980 births
Living people
Detroit Vipers players
Frölunda HC players
HC Košice players
HC Neftekhimik Nizhnekamsk players
HC Olomouc players
HC Plzeň players
HC Spartak Moscow players
HC Vityaz players
PSG Berani Zlín players
Hershey Bears players
Ice hockey players at the 2006 Winter Olympics
Ice hockey players at the 2010 Winter Olympics
Medicine Hat Tigers players
MHk 32 Liptovský Mikuláš players
Olympic ice hockey players of Slovakia
Sportspeople from Liptovský Mikuláš
Severstal Cherepovets players
Slovak expatriate ice hockey players in Russia
Slovak ice hockey centres
Södertälje SK players
Springfield Falcons players
Stanley Cup champions
Tampa Bay Lightning draft picks
Tampa Bay Lightning players
Slovak expatriate ice hockey players in Sweden
Slovak expatriate ice hockey players in Canada
Slovak expatriate ice hockey players in the Czech Republic
Slovak expatriate ice hockey players in the United States